is a railway station on the Hakodate Main Line in Mori, Hokkaido, Japan, operated by the Hokkaido Railway Company (JR Hokkaido).

Lines
Mori Station is served by the Hakodate Main Line.

Station layout
The station has one island platform and one side platform serving a total of three tracks.

Platforms

Adjacent stations

History
The station opened on 28 June 1903. With the privatization of Japanese National Railways (JNR) on 1 April 1987, the station came under the control of JR Hokkaido.

Surrounding area
  National Route 5
 Uniushi Park

See also
 List of railway stations in Japan
 Ikameshi

References

External links

  

Railway stations in Hokkaido Prefecture
Stations of Hokkaido Railway Company
Railway stations in Japan opened in 1903